Bacon Grabbers is a 1929 silent comedy short starring Laurel and Hardy.

Plot
Laurel and Hardy are employed as repossession men for the local sheriff's office. They are given the challenging task of repossessing a radio owned by Collis P. Kennedy, described as a tough customer, who has not paid any installments since 1921. Kennedy first chases Laurel and Hardy off his property with a toy bulldog. Then he barricades himself in his home, thwarting all efforts by the repo men to enter and recover the radio. When a wayward rifle shot by Kennedy knocks the top off a nearby fire hydrant and soaks a policeman, the cop investigates. Laurel and Hardy, with the officer's assistance, are finally permitted to enter Kennedy's house and take the radio. It is abandoned in the street, however, while Kennedy and the repo men exchange kicks. A steamroller from a construction site comes along and flattens the unattended radio. Moments later, Mrs. Kennedy arrives and happily tells her husband that she has paid the outstanding debt. The radio—now in pieces—is theirs. As Laurel and Hardy both laugh at Kennedy's misfortune, the steamroller returns and flattens their car too.

Notes
Jean Harlow, who was given star billing, appears on the screen as Mrs. Kennedy for only about 30 seconds at the end of the movie.

The title Bacon Grabbers was 1920s slang for "repo men."

The movie was filmed at 2980 Haddington Drive and 10341 Bannockburn Drive in Cheviot Hills, Los Angeles.

Cast

References

External links 

 

1929 films
1929 comedy films
American silent short films
American black-and-white films
Short films directed by Lewis R. Foster
Laurel and Hardy (film series)
Metro-Goldwyn-Mayer short films
Films with screenplays by H. M. Walker
1929 short films
American comedy short films
1920s American films
Silent American comedy films